One More Train to Rob is a 1971 American comedy western film directed by Andrew McLaglen, starring George Peppard, and featuring Diana Muldaur, John Vernon and 
France Nuyen.

The shooting title for the film was Hark.

Plot
Set in the Old West, the story is about train-robber Harker Fleet (Peppard), who is sent to prison for assaulting a sheriff and his deputy while trying to escape a forced marriage, set up by his former partner, Timothy Xavier Nolan (John Vernon). Fleet serves his time, but gets out of prison early, for good behavior. Once he is released from prison, he travels to the town of Calador, intending to settle the score with Nolan for railroading him and stealing his woman, Katy (Diana Muldaur).

Cast
 George Peppard as Harker Fleet
 Diana Muldaur as Katy
 John Vernon as Timothy Xavier Nolan
 France Nuyen as Ah Toy
 Soon-Tek Oh as Yung
 Steve Sandor as Jim Gant
 Pamela McMyler as Cora Mae Jones
 Richard Loo as Mr. Chang
 Robert Donner as Sheriff Adams
 John Doucette as Sheriff Monte
 C.K. Yang as Wong
 Marie Windsor as Louella
 Timothy Scott as Slim
 Joan Shawlee as Big Nellie
 Hal Needham as Bert Gant
 Harry Carey, Jr. as Red

Production
Filming started 9 March 1970.

See also
 List of American films of 1971

References

External links
 
 
 
 
 

1971 films
1971 comedy films
1971 Western (genre) films
1970s Western (genre) comedy films
American Western (genre) comedy films
Films directed by Andrew McLaglen
Films scored by David Shire
Rail transport films
Films with screenplays by William Roberts (screenwriter)
1970s English-language films
1970s American films